Skjervøy kommune is a municipality in Troms og Finnmark county, Norway. The administrative centre of the municipality is the town of Skjervøy on the island of Skjervøya, where most of the inhabitants live. The main industries are fishing and shipbuilding.

The  municipality is the 212th largest by area out of the 356 municipalities in Norway. Skjervøy is the 237th most populous municipality in Norway with a population of 2,804.

General information
The municipality of Skjervøe (later spelled Skjervøy) was established on 1 January 1838 (see formannskapsdistrikt law). In 1863, the southeastern (inland) part of the municipality (population: 1,677) was separated to form the new Kvænangen Municipality. This left 2,785 people in Skjervøy. Then on 1 January 1886 the southern part of the municipality (population: 1,057) was separated from Skjervøy to form the new Nordreisa Municipality. This left 2,096 inhabitants in Skjervøy.

On 1 January 1890, the Trætten and Loppevolden farms (population: 32) were transferred from Skjervøy to Nordreisa. On 1 January 1965, the Meilands area (population: 12) was transferred to Kvænangen. On 1 January 1972, the parts of Skjervøy lying on the mainland (population: 1,556) were transferred from Skjervøy to Nordreisa, and the uninhabited Mannskarvik farm was transferred to Kvænangen. Then on 1 January 1982 the southern part of the island of Uløya (population: 128) was transferred from Skjervøy to Nordreisa.

On 1 January 2020, the municipality became part of the newly formed Troms og Finnmark county. Previously, it had been part of the old Troms county.

Name
The municipality (originally the parish) is named after the small island of Skjervøya since the first Skjervøy Church was built there. Historically, the name was spelled Skjervøe and then more recently it was spelled Skjervø. In 1909, the name was changed to the present spelling Skjervøy.

Coat of arms
The coat of arms was granted on 27 March 1987. The official blazon is "Argent, a cormorant head erased sable". This means the arms have a field (background) with a tincture of argent which means it is commonly colored white, but if it is made out of metal, then silver is used. The charge is the head of a cormorant which has a tincture of sable. The arms are partly canting since the Norwegian word  means cormorant and that word is similar to the name Skjervøy. The cormorant also symbolizes the coastal municipality, which (like the bird) is dependent on fishing for its living. The cormorant is also a common bird in the area. The arms were designed by Kåre Bondesen and Jan Roald Andreassen.

Churches
The Church of Norway has one parish within the municipality of Skjervøy. It is part of the Nord-Troms prosti (deanery) in the Diocese of Nord-Hålogaland.

History
Skjervøy Church dates back to 1728 and it is the oldest wooden church in Troms county. The village of Maursund is an old trading post with well-preserved 19th-century houses.

Government
All municipalities in Norway, including Skjervøy, are responsible for primary education (through 10th grade), outpatient health services, senior citizen services, unemployment and other social services, zoning, economic development, and municipal roads. The municipality is governed by a municipal council of elected representatives, which in turn elect a mayor.  The municipality falls under the Nord-Troms District Court and the Hålogaland Court of Appeal.

Municipal council
The municipal council  of Skjervøy is made up of 19 representatives that are elected to four year terms. The party breakdown of the council is as follows:

Mayors
The mayors of Skjervøy:

1837–1838: Jens Schmidt 
1839–1840: Peder Borch Lund 
1841–1853: Samuel Bugge Giæver 
1854–1858: Andreas Qvale 
1859–1860: Peder Borch Lund 
1861–1866: Andreas Qvale 
1867–1868: Simon Kildal Giæver 
1869–1872: Christian Magelssen 
1873–1874: Bendiks Bæverdahl 
1875–1878: Christian Magelssen 
1879–1880: Johannes Holmboe Giæver 
1881–1892: John Hagen (V)
1893–1894: Ivar Lund 
1895–1896: Peder Martin Blyth Daae 
1897–1901: Johan Georgsen 
1902–1913: Marcelius Hansen (V)
1914–1922: Thorvald Hoseth Giæver 
1923–1925: Marcelius Hansen (V)
1926–1941: Rønning Østgaard (Bp)
1945-1945: Nils Jacobsen 
1945-1945: Peder Rasmus Dyrkoren 
1945-1945: Thorvald Hoseth Giæver
1946–1963: Lars Hallen (Ap)
1964–1971: John Steffensen (Ap)
1972–1982: Aksel Jørgensen (V)
1983–1995: Kurt Leif Strøm (H)
1995–2011: Roy Waage (KrF/K)
2011–2015: Torgeir Johnsen (K/Sp)
2015–present: Ørjan Albrigtsen (KrF)

Geography
The island municipality is surrounded by the Norwegian Sea to the north, Ullsfjorden to the west, Lyngenfjorden to the southwest, Reisafjorden to the southeast, and Kvænangen fjord to the east. The municipality consists of several islands, the major one being Arnøya, with the villages of Årviksand, Akkarvik, and Arnøyhamn. Most people, however, live on the relatively small island of Skjervøya, where more than 2,316 people live in the central village of Skjervøy with its sheltered harbour. The other islands include Haukøya, Kågen, Laukøya, Vorterøya, and the northern half of Uløya. Kågen and Skjervøya are connected by the Skjervøy Bridge. Kågen is connected to the mainland by the Maursund Tunnel.

Climate
Skjervøy has continental subarctic climate. The Köppen Climate Classification subtype for this climate is "Dfc". The Norwegian Meteorological Institute has been operating a weather station in Skjervøy since 1936.

Transportation
The Hurtigruten (coastal cruise and cargo ship service) stops at the village of Skjervøy. There is also a scheduled express ferry operated by Boreal Transport Nord AS with intermediate stops between the village of Skjervøy and the city of Tromsø. The undersea Maursund Tunnel connects this island with the mainland to the south. There are also ferry connections between the islands of Arnøya and Laukøya offered by both Boreal Transport Nord AS and Torghatten Nord AS. Sørkjosen Airport offers flights to Tromsø and several destinations in Finnmark.

Notable people
 Leonhard Seppala (1877 - 1967) Norwegian-Kveni dog musher, brought up in Skjervøy
 Knut Werner Hansen (born 1951 in Skjervøy) a Norwegian politician, county Mayor of Troms
 Hanne Grete Einarsen (born 1966) Norwegian-Sami artist, brought up in Skjervøy
 Odd-Karl Stangnes (born 1968 in Skjervøy) a Norwegian football coach and former player
 Kristina Torbergsen (born 1987 in Skjervøy) a Norwegian politician

Media gallery

References

External links

Municipal fact sheet from Statistics Norway 
41 kg cod caught on fishing rod April 2010 (with pictures) 
Visit Tromso January 2018 list of Express Boats and Ferry service for Tromso.
Boreal Transport Nord Nord AS January 2018 list for ferry routes by ferry operator for Troms county

 
Municipalities of Troms og Finnmark
1838 establishments in Norway